The Serbs of Vukovar ( or ) are one of traditional communities living in the multicultural, multi-ethnic and multi-confessional eastern Croatian town of Vukovar on the border with Serbia. The Serb community constitutes slightly over one third of the entire population of Vukovar according to 2011 Census. Other significant communities include the Croat majority, as well as Hungarians, Slovaks, Rusyns, Ukrainians and historically Yugoslavs, Germans, Jews, Vlachs and Turks.

The town is the seat of numerous ethnic organizations and institutions, including the headquarters of the Joint Council of Municipalities and the Independent Democratic Serb Party. The surrounding rural region is ethnically heterogeneous. The Serb rural communities constitute the majority in physically adjacent Borovo and the municipalities of Trpinja and Negoslavci. While Vukovar lies on the state border with the Republic of Serbia (Danube River) the closest border crossings are over the bridges in Erdut and Ilok or via the land border crossing in Tovarnik. Prominent Serbs from Vukovar include Zaharije Orfelin and Siniša Mihajlović.

During the Croatian War of Independence Vukovar became one of the major hotspots of Serb-Croat ethnic conflicts, especially at the time of the Battle of Vukovar after which the town became de facto seat of the self proclaimed Serb Autonomous Oblast Eastern Slavonia, Baranja and Western Syrmia. After the Operation Storm, signing of the Erdut Agreement and the end of the UNTAES mission of the United Nations gradual process of reconciliation started aimed at the establishment of sustainable peace. Despite absence of physical borders, Vukovar is often described as an ethnically divided town.

Both Serbs and Croats in Vukovar show cases of stereotypical victim mentality which affects propensity towards reconciliation.

History

War in Croatia

In the summer of 1991, Tomislav Merčep, at the time a leading official in the Croatian Democratic Union (HDZ) and Secretary of People's Defense, was put in charge of the town. Ethnic Serbs in Vukovar were subjected to forced interrogations, kidnappings and summary executions in addition to having their homes and cafes blown up. NGOs in the city state that a total of 86 Serbs were killed or disappeared during Merčep's control of the town. These crimes occurred prior to the Battle of Vukovar in August 1991, when the town officially became a war zone. 

After Vukovar fell to the Yugoslav People's Army (JNA) on 18 November 1991, the JNA imprisoned 2,000 people at the Velepromet industrial facility in Vukovar, 800 of whom were classified by the JNA as prisoners of war. Many were brutally interrogated, several were shot on the spot by TO members and paramilitaries, and others were sent to Ovčara, where they were killed in the massacre. Thousands more were transferred to prison camps in Serbia and rebel-controlled Croatia. There were also incidents of war rape, for which two soldiers were later convicted. The non-Serb population of the town and the surrounding region was systematically ethnically cleansed, and at least 20,000 of Vukovar's inhabitants were forced to leave. Vukovar was systematically looted after its capture. Serbia returned 2,000 pieces of looted art in December 2001. Overall, around 3,000 people died during the battle.

Vukovar would formally become part of the Republic of Serb Krajina. After the end of the war, Croatia and local Serb authorities signed the Erdut agreement in November 1995 and the region was reintegrated into the Croatian republic.

Serbs have long voiced their concerns about the crimes committed against them in the months before the JNA took over the town and the lack of accountability for the perpetrators. The matter has remained unresolved, with Merčep only being sentenced in 2017 for crimes committed by his units elsewhere. He died in November 2020.

Contemporary period

According to 2011 Croatian census, the Serbian population account one third of town population, which is the legal prerequisite for obligatory introduction of Serbian (Cyrillic) name of the city to become co-official under Croatian Constitutional law on national minorities rights. In 2013, this has re-ignited a political discussion on the matter, continuing on the 2009 local promulgation of Serbian Cyrillic as available for public use.

Demographics

The Croats were in the majority in most villages and in the region's eastern part, whereas the Serbs dominated in northwest. Vukovar's population was ethnically mixed and had 28 ethnic groups before the war. According to 2011 Croatian census, Serbian population of the town account 34.87% of Vukovar total population.

Culture

Organizations

Other cultural and civic organizations are located in Vukovar and among them Association for Serbian language and literature in Croatia, Radio Dunav (Radio Danube) and local Prosvjeta.

Religion

Church of St. Nicholas

Serbian Orthodox Church of St Nicholas in Vukovar is one of the oldest baroque buildings of the Serbian community north of the Sava River. Present day church was built in the period from 1733 till 1737. St Nicholas inventory along church itself, is stated separately in Register of Cultural Goods of Croatia as a collection protected cultural property.

Next to the Church of St. Nicholas is located Serbian Home, established in 1733 with current building dating back to 1905. Building is today subject to ownership dispute between town and Serbian Orthodox Church. Since 1991 building is temporary facility for religious rites until church interior renovation of Church of St. Nicholas is completed.

St. Petka's Church

Education
In the aftermath of the reintegration of Vukovar, two parallel system of education in Croatian and Serbian were developed resulting in a de facto ethnic division of pupils. In 2011 95% of students in Serbian-language classes were ethnic Serbs, whereas 86% of students in Croatian-language classes were ethnic Croats. This model is developed in accordance with the Constitutional Act on the Rights of National Minorities in the Republic of Croatia and is used by Serb communities in Borovo, Markušica, Bršadin and other settlements in eastern Slavonia as well as by Hungarian minority in the region and Czech and Italian minority in Croatia.

Long duration research established that among Serb parents in Vukovar support for the separated system of education was 73% in 2001, 66% in 2007 and 75% in 2011. Support among Serb students was 82% in 2001, 70% in 2007 and 68% in 2011. Among Croat students approval rate was decreasing from 80% in 2001, 72% in 2007 to 71% in 2011, and among parents from 66% in 2001, to 68% in 2007 to 55% in 2011. In 2011 an integrated curriculum in which only additional elective classes in Serbian language and culture will be provided was supported by 65% of parents and 49% of students in Serb community and 78% of students and 92% of parents in Croat community. Some authors argue that for successful integration of the two school systems in Vukovar multicultural and intercultural model needs to be develop which will result in compromise and change in both communities. Ethnic distance among students in Vukovar is larger than among their parents.

Đorđe Nešić, director of the Cultural and Scientific Center "Milutin Milanković" expressed concerns that integrated education may lead to assimilation of Serb community while Milica Stojanović, Chairperson of the Education Board of the Joint Council of Municipalities expressed her opinion that the existing model is the best one for Serb community as it is preparing students for higher education both in Croatia and Serbia.

Higher education at the local public Polytechnic Lavoslav Ružička Vukovar is not provided in Serbian.

Integrated School in Vukovar
In 2004 Zoran Milanović signed an international agreement on financial assistance with the Kingdom of Norway (with the minor contribution of Liechtenstein and Iceland) for the establishment of the so-called Integrated School in Vukovar. The agreement provided 1,3 million euros or 98% of the entire costs needed for the establishment of the school while Croatian Government enacted special curriculum for the school. As of 2017 there was not a single student enrolled in the school resulting in Norwegian request for return of funding. Vukovar mayor Željko Sabo from the Social Democratic Party of Croatia accused the Croatian Democratic Union and the Independent Democratic Serb Party of sabotage of the project.

Political influence

Serbs are playing prominent role in a political life of the town. Constitutional Act on the Rights of National Minorities in the Republic of Croatia is providing legal guaranties for the proportional representation of Serbs in all institutions of the town including proportional representation in the local Council. Since the end of the Croatian War of Independence member of the Serb community is guaranteed right to hold the post of town's vice-major. On October 2, 1997 Secretary-General of the United Nations Kofi Annan expressed concern that power sharing agreement between Croat and Serb political parties is not working well due to demonstrable lack of commitment by Croatian officials. As of December 2018 Serb vice-major of Vukovar was Srđan Milaković of the Independent Democratic Serb Party. The party was established in 1997 and its headquarters are located in Vukovar. It is dominant party controlling all mandates guaranteed to Serb community in Croatian Parliament. There is also non-parliamentary nationalist Party of Danube Serbs.

Significant number of Serbs in Vukovar and eastern Slavonia traditionally vote for parties without ethnic name. The most popular among them is the Social Democratic Party of Croatia (SDP), successor of the League of Communists of Croatia, Croatian branch of the League of Communists of Yugoslavia. Serbs in Vukovar may vote for SDP as a part of tactical voting against local Croatian nationalism. In 2015 Croatian political party Most accused the SDP of fictive votes by voters from Serbia. Most's statements were denied by the Ministry of Public Administration Arsen Bauk.

In 2013, the introduction of Serbian into official use triggered Anti-Cyrillic protests in Croatia with situation remaining open political controversy.

In January 2019 Mayor of Vukovar Ivan Penava of the Croatian Democratic Union said that Vukovar was the "epicenter of continued, creeping Greater Serbian aggression." Some of the media reported that major will leave his party what he denied. Subsequently, he meet with the Prime Minister of Croatia Andrej Plenković who stated that "HDZ policy was defined by the party leadership, while mayor Penava should deal with issues pertaining to the town of Vukovar". Prime Minister also stated that it is his party strategic interest to cooperate with the Independent Democratic Serb Party and the Serb community, policy which was based on the policy of the first Croatian President Franjo Tuđman and that major Penava should understand it even better as fellow citizens from Serb minority have supported him at the Vukovar elections.

The town was criticized by Serbian right-wing nationalist Dveri movement for the exclusion of its Serb history as there is not a single street named after notable Vukovar Serb, Serb historical monuments are not promoted by the local tourism office and cultural events are not even mentioned in the town's annual almanac.

2010 Presidents Josipović-Tadić Meeting
2010 presidential meeting was characterized by a very performative daily agenda. President of Serbia Boris Tadić and his delegation which included Ambassador of Netherlands in Serbia arrived to Vukovar on a Danube ferryboat Golubica ('Dove', referring to the Vučedol Dove). Delegation started its visit by meeting the Major of Vukovar where they submitted documentation from the central hospital which was taken by Serb forces once they left the Republic of Serbian Krajina. President of Serbia then visited Ovčara camp where he issued apology for the Vukovar massacre and laid wreaths in respect to the victims. Flowing the visit both Croatian and Serbian presidents continued to Paulin Dvor where they both laid wreaths for the victims of the Paulin Dvor massacre.

Joint Council of Municipalities

Headquarters of the Joint Council of Municipalities, sui generis inter-municipal body formed on the basis of Erdut agreement, is located in Vukovar as well. Joint Council of Municipalities coordinates initiatives and proposals to the institutions of government, international organisations and NGOs.

Consulate General of the Republic of Serbia

The Consulate-General of the Republic of Serbia in Vukovar was established on 5 February 1998. The Consulate General is the only foreign representation in the town. On February 15, 2014, Statehood Day of the Republic of Serbia, Consulate General moved to its new building which was acquired from the Vojislav Stanimirović family who change it for an apartment in Belgrade. Consulate is a polling place during the elections in Serbia for Serbian citizens in the region. Before 2014 the Consulate General was located in a building without building permit completed in 1993 after the end of the Battle of Vukovar. The old building was purchased by the Town of Vukovar with an intention to open the Music School in it.

Media
In addition to national and regional media of Croatia other media houses are popular among the Serbs of Vukovar. Local Radio Dunav station broadcasting in Serbian is located in Vukovar, while Radio Borovo is major Serbian-language media in the region. As the town is located on the state border radio and television stations from Serbia are easily accessible in Vukovar with Radio Television of Serbia and Radio Television of Vojvodina broadcasting program for Serbs in eastern Croatia produced by Joint Council of Municipalities. Serbian-language printed media include Novosti (published by Serb National Council), Bijela Pčela and Prosvjeta (published by Prosvjeta), Izvor (published by Joint Council of Municipalities) and Identitet (published by Serb Democratic Forum) as well as newspapers from Serbia. Serbian-language media from Bosnia and Herzegovina are accessible and popular as well, especially RTV BN and Radio Television of Republika Srpska which have occasional programs about or targeted at local audience.

Gallery

Notable individuals
Zaharije Orfelin
Siniša Mihajlović
Milan Mačvan
Đorđe Ivanović
Milan Gajić

See also
Serbs of Croatia
Serbs of Zagreb
Serbs in Dubrovnik
Vukovar resolution
Borovo, Croatia

References

Sources

External links

Serb communities in Croatia
Vukovar
Vukovar
Vukovar-Syrmia County